Halle Maria Berry (born Maria Halle Berry; August 14, 1966) is an American actress. She began her career as a model and entered several beauty contests, finishing as the first runner-up in the Miss USA pageant and coming in sixth in the Miss World 1986. Her breakthrough film role was in the romantic comedy Boomerang (1992), alongside Eddie Murphy, which led to roles in The Flintstones (1994) and Bulworth (1998) as well as the television film Introducing Dorothy Dandridge (1999), for which she won a Primetime Emmy Award and a Golden Globe Award.

Berry established herself as one of the highest-paid actresses in Hollywood during the 2000s. She won the Academy Award for Best Actress for her performance of a struggling widow in the romantic drama Monster's Ball (2001), becoming both the only Black woman and the first (and for 21 years, the only) woman of color to have won the award. She took on high-profile roles such as Storm in four installments of the X-Men film series (2000–2014), the henchwoman of a robber in the thriller Swordfish (2001), Bond girl Jinx in Die Another Day (2002), and the title role in the much-derided Catwoman (2004), the latter for which she received US$12.5 million.

A varying critical and commercial reception followed in subsequent years, with Perfect Stranger (2007), Cloud Atlas (2012) and The Call (2013) being among her notable film releases in that period. She launched a production company, 606 Films, in 2014 and has been involved in the production of a number of projects in which she performed, such as the CBS science fiction series Extant (2014–2015). She appeared in the action films Kingsman: The Golden Circle (2017) and John Wick: Chapter 3 – Parabellum (2019) and made her directorial debut with the Netflix drama Bruised (2020).

Berry has been a Revlon spokesmodel since 1996. She was formerly married to baseball player David Justice, singer-songwriter Eric Benét, and actor Olivier Martinez. She has two children, one with Martinez and another with model Gabriel Aubry.

Early life
Berry was born Maria Halle Berry in Cleveland, Ohio, on August 14, 1966, to Judith Ann (née Hawkins), an English immigrant from Liverpool, and Jerome Jesse Berry, an African-American man. Her name was legally changed to Halle Maria Berry at the age of five. Her parents selected her middle name from Halle's Department Store, which was then a local landmark in Cleveland. Berry's mother worked as a psychiatric nurse, and her father worked in the same hospital as an attendant in the psychiatric ward; he later became a bus driver. They divorced when Berry was four years old, and she and her older sister Heidi Berry-Henderson were raised exclusively by their mother. She has been estranged from her father since childhood, noting in 1992 that she did not even know if he was still alive. Her father was abusive to her mother, and Berry has recalled witnessing her mother being beaten daily, kicked down stairs, and hit in the head with a wine bottle.

Berry grew up in Oakwood, Ohio, and graduated from Bedford High School, where she was a cheerleader, honor student, editor of the school newspaper, and prom queen. She worked in the children's department at Higbee's Department store. She then studied at Cuyahoga Community College. In the 1980s, she entered several beauty contests, winning Miss Teen All American 1985 and Miss Ohio USA in 1986. She was the 1986 Miss USA first runner-up to Christy Fichtner of Texas. In the Miss USA 1986 pageant interview competition, she said she hoped to become an entertainer or to have something to do with the media. Her interview was awarded the highest score by the judges. She was the first African-American Miss World entrant in 1986, where she finished sixth and Trinidad and Tobago's Giselle Laronde was crowned Miss World.

Career

Early work and breakthrough (1989–1999)
In 1989, Berry moved to New York City to pursue her acting ambitions. During her early time there, she ran out of money and briefly lived in a homeless shelter and a YMCA. Her situation improved by the end of that year, and she was cast in the role of model Emily Franklin in the short-lived ABC television series Living Dolls, which was shot in New York and was a spin-off of the hit series Who's the Boss?. During the taping of Living Dolls, she lapsed into a coma and was diagnosed with type 1 diabetes. After the cancellation of Living Dolls, she moved to Los Angeles.

Berry's film debut was in a small role for Spike Lee's Jungle Fever (1991), in which she played Vivian, a drug addict. That same year, Berry had her first co-starring role in Strictly Business. In 1992, Berry portrayed a career woman who falls for the lead character played by Eddie Murphy in the romantic comedy Boomerang. The following year, she caught the public's attention as a headstrong biracial slave in the TV adaptation of Queen: The Story of an American Family, based on the book by Alex Haley. Berry was in the live-action Flintstones movie playing the part of "Sharon Stone," a sultry secretary who attempts to seduce Fred Flintstone.

Berry tackled a more serious role, playing a former drug addict struggling to regain custody of her son in Losing Isaiah (1995), starring opposite Jessica Lange. She portrayed Sandra Beecher in Race the Sun (1996), which was based on a true story, shot in Australia, and co-starred alongside Kurt Russell in Executive Decision. Beginning in 1996, she was a Revlon spokeswoman for seven years and renewed her contract in 2004.

She starred alongside Natalie Deselle Reid in the 1997 comedy film B*A*P*S. In 1998, Berry received praise for her role in Bulworth as an intelligent woman raised by activists who gives a politician (Warren Beatty) a new lease on life. The same year, she played the singer Zola Taylor, one of the three wives of pop singer Frankie Lymon, in the biopic Why Do Fools Fall in Love.

In the 1999 HBO biopic Introducing Dorothy Dandridge, she portrayed the first African American woman to be nominated for the Academy Award for Best Actress, and it was to Berry a heart-felt project that she introduced, co-produced and fought intensely for it to come through. Berry's performance was recognized with several awards, including a Primetime Emmy Award and Golden Globe Award.

Worldwide recognition (2000–2004)
Berry portrayed the mutant superhero Storm in the film adaptation of the comic book series X-Men (2000) and its sequels, X2 (2003), X-Men: The Last Stand (2006) and X-Men: Days of Future Past (2014). In 2001, Berry appeared in the film Swordfish, which featured her first topless scene. At first, she was opposed to a sunbathing scene in the film in which she would appear topless, but Berry eventually agreed. Some people attributed her change of heart to a substantial increase in the amount Warner Bros. offered her; she was reportedly paid an additional $500,000 for the short scene. Berry denied these stories, telling one interviewer that they amused her and "made for great publicity for the movie." After turning down numerous roles that required nudity, she said she decided to make Swordfish because her then-husband, Eric Benét, supported her and encouraged her to take risks.

Berry appeared as Leticia Musgrove, the troubled wife of an executed murderer (Sean Combs), in the 2001 feature film Monster's Ball. Her performance was awarded the National Board of Review and the Screen Actors Guild Award for Best Actress; in an interesting coincidence she became the first African American woman to win the Academy Award for Best Actress (earlier in her career, she portrayed Dorothy Dandridge, the first African American to be nominated for Best Actress, and who was born at the same hospital as Berry, in Cleveland, Ohio). The NAACP issued the statement: "Congratulations to Halle Berry and Denzel Washington for giving us hope and making us proud. If this is a sign that Hollywood is finally ready to give opportunity and judge performance based on skill and not on skin color then it is a good thing." This role generated controversy. Her graphic nude love scene with a racist character played by co-star Billy Bob Thornton was the subject of much media chatter and discussion among African Americans. Many in the African-American community were critical of Berry for taking the part. Berry responded: "I don't really see a reason to ever go that far again. That was a unique movie. That scene was special and pivotal and needed to be there, and it would be a really special script that would require something like that again."

Berry asked for a higher fee for Revlon advertisements after winning the Oscar. Ron Perelman, the cosmetics firm's chief, congratulated her, saying how happy he was that she modeled for his company. She replied, "Of course, you'll have to pay me more." Perelman stalked off in a rage. In accepting her award, she gave an acceptance speech honoring previous black actresses who had never had the opportunity. She said, "This moment is so much bigger than me. This is for every nameless, faceless woman of color who now has a chance tonight because this door has been opened."

As Bond girl Giacinta 'Jinx' Johnson in the 2002 blockbuster Die Another Day, Berry recreated a scene from Dr. No, emerging from the surf to be greeted by James Bond as Ursula Andress had 40 years earlier. Lindy Hemming, costume designer on Die Another Day, had insisted that Berry wear a bikini and knife as a homage. Berry has said of the scene: "It's splashy", "exciting", "sexy", "provocative" and "it will keep me still out there after winning an Oscar." According to an ITV news poll, Jinx was voted the fourth toughest girl on screen of all time. Berry was hurt during filming when debris from a smoke grenade flew into her eye. It was removed in a 30-minute operation. After Berry won the Academy Award, rewrites were commissioned to give her more screentime for X2.

She starred in the psychological thriller Gothika opposite Robert Downey, Jr. in November 2003, during which she broke her arm in a scene with Downey, who twisted her arm too hard. Production was halted for eight weeks. It was a moderate hit at the United States box office, taking in $60 million; it earned another $80 million abroad. Berry appeared in the nu metal band Limp Bizkit's music video for "Behind Blue Eyes" for the motion picture soundtrack for the film. The same year, she was named No. 1 in FHMs 100 Sexiest Women in the World poll.

Berry starred as the title role in the film Catwoman, for which she received US$12.5 million. and is widely regarded by critics as one of the worst films ever made. She was awarded the Worst Actress Razzie Award for her performance; she appeared at the ceremony to accept the award in person (while holding her Oscar from Monster's Ball) with a sense of humor, considering it an experience of the "rock bottom" in order to be "at the top." Holding the Academy Award in one hand and the Razzie in the other she said, "I never in my life thought that I would be up here, winning a Razzie! It's not like I ever aspired to be here, but thank you. When I was a kid, my mother told me that if you could not be a good loser, then there's no way you could be a good winner."

Established actress (2005–2013)

Her next film appearance was in the Oprah Winfrey-produced ABC television movie Their Eyes Were Watching God (2005), an adaptation of Zora Neale Hurston's novel, with Berry portraying a free-spirited woman whose unconventional sexual mores upset her 1920s contemporaries in a small community. She received her second Primetime Emmy Award nomination for her role. Also in 2005, she served as an executive producer in Lackawanna Blues, and landed her voice for the character of Cappy, one of the many mechanical beings in the animated feature Robots.

In the thriller Perfect Stranger (2007), Berry starred with Bruce Willis, playing a reporter who goes undercover to uncover the killer of her childhood friend. The film grossed a modest US$73 million worldwide, and received lukewarm reviews from critics, who felt that despite the presence of Berry and Willis, it is "too convoluted to work, and features a twist ending that's irritating and superfluous." Her next 2007 film release was the drama Things We Lost in the Fire, co-starring Benicio del Toro, where she took on the role of a recent widow befriending the troubled friend of her late husband. The film was the first time in which she worked with a female director, Danish Susanne Bier, giving her a new feeling of "thinking the same way," which she appreciated. While the film made US$8.6 million in its global theatrical run, it garnered positive reviews from writers; The Austin Chronicle found the film to be "an impeccably constructed and perfectly paced drama of domestic and internal volatility" and felt that "Berry is brilliant here, as good as she's ever been."

In April 2007, Berry was awarded a star on the Hollywood Walk of Fame in front of the Kodak Theatre at 6801 Hollywood Boulevard for her contributions to the film industry, and by the end of the decade, she established herself as one of the highest-paid actresses in Hollywood, earning an estimated $10 million per film.

In the independent drama Frankie and Alice (2010), Berry played the leading role of a young multiracial American woman with dissociative identity disorder struggling against her alter personality to retain her true self. The film received a limited theatrical release, to a mixed critical response. The Hollywood Reporter nevertheless described the film as "a well-wrought psychological drama that delves into the dark side of one woman's psyche" and found Berry to be "spellbinding" in it. She earned the African-American Film Critics Association Award for Best Actress and a Golden Globe Award nomination for Best Actress – Motion Picture Drama. She next made part of a large ensemble cast in Garry Marshall's romantic comedy New Year's Eve (2011), with Michelle Pfeiffer, Jessica Biel, Robert De Niro, Josh Duhamel, Zac Efron, Sarah Jessica Parker, and Sofía Vergara, among many others. In the film, she took on the supporting role of a nurse befriending a man in the final stages (De Niro). While the film was panned by critics, it made US$142 million worldwide.

In 2012, Berry starred as an expert diver tutor alongside then-husband Olivier Martinez in the little-seen thriller Dark Tide, and led an ensemble cast opposite Tom Hanks and Jim Broadbent in The Wachowskis's epic science fiction film Cloud Atlas (2012), with each of the actors playing six different characters across a period of five centuries. Budgeted at US$128.8 million, Cloud Atlas made US$130.4 million worldwide, and garnered polarized reactions from both critics and audiences.

Berry appeared in a segment of the independent anthology comedy Movie 43 (2013), which the Chicago Sun-Times called "the Citizen Kane of awful." Berry found greater success with her next performance, as a 9-1-1 operator receiving a call from a girl kidnapped by a serial killer, in the crime thriller The Call (2013). Berry was drawn to "the idea of being a part of a movie that was so empowering for women. We don't often get to play roles like this, where ordinary people become heroic and do something extraordinary." Manohla Dargis of The New York Times found the film to be "an effectively creepy thriller," while reviewer Dwight Brown felt that "the script gives Berry a blue-collar character she can make accessible, vulnerable and gutsy[...]." The Call was a sleeper hit, grossing US$68.6 million around the globe.

Continued film and television work (2014–present)
In 2014, Berry signed on to star and serve as a co-executive producer in CBS drama series Extant, where she took on the role of Molly Woods, an astronaut who struggles to reconnect with her husband and android son after spending 13 months in space. The show ran for two seasons until 2015, receiving largely positive reviews from critics. USA Today remarked: "She [Halle Berry] brings a dignity and gravity to Molly, a projected intelligence that allows you to buy her as an astronaut and to see what has happened to her as frightening rather than ridiculous. Berry's all in, and you float along." Also in 2014, Berry launched a new production company, 606 Films, with producing partner Elaine Goldsmith-Thomas. It is named after the Anti-Paparazzi Bill, SB 606, that the actress pushed for and which was signed into law by California Governor Jerry Brown in the fall of 2013. The new company emerged as part of a deal for Berry to work in Extant.

In the stand-up comedy concert film Kevin Hart: What Now? (2016), Berry appeared as herself, opposite Kevin Hart, attending a poker game event that goes horribly wrong. She provided uncredited vocals to the song, "Calling All My Lovelies" by Bruno Mars from his third studio album, 24K Magic (2016). Kidnap, an abduction thriller Berry filmed in 2014, was released in 2017. In the film, she starred as a diner waitress tailing a vehicle when her son is kidnapped by its occupants. Kidnap grossed US$34 million and garnered mixed reviews from writers, who felt that it "strays into poorly scripted exploitation too often to take advantage of its pulpy premise — or the still-impressive talents of [Berry]." She next played an agent employed by a secret American spy organisation in the action comedy sequel Kingsman: The Golden Circle (2017), as part of an ensemble cast, consisting of Colin Firth, Taron Egerton, Mark Strong, Julianne Moore, and Elton John. While critical response towards the film was mixed, it made US$414 million worldwide.

Alongside Daniel Craig, Berry starred as a working-class mother during the 1992 Los Angeles riots in Deniz Gamze Ergüven's drama Kings (2017). The film found a limited theatrical release following its initial screening at the Toronto International Film Festival, and as part of an overall lukewarm reception, Variety noted: "It should be said that Berry has given some of the best and worst performances of the past quarter-century, but this is perhaps the only one that swings to both extremes in the same movie." Berry competed against James Corden in the first rap battle on the first episode of TBS's Drop the Mic, originally aired on October 24, 2017.

She played Sofia, an assassin, in the film John Wick: Chapter 3 – Parabellum, which was released on May 17, 2019, by Lionsgate. She is, as of February 2019, executive producer of the BET television series Boomerang, based on the film in which she starred. The series premiered February 12, 2019.

Berry made her directorial debut with the feature Bruised in which she plays a disgraced MMA fighter named Jackie Justice, who reconnects with her estranged son. The film premiered at the Toronto International Film Festival in September 2020 and was released on Netflix in November 2021. Berry received a positive review from Deadline for her performance.

Media image
Berry was ranked No. 1 on People "50 Most Beautiful People in the World" list in 2003 after making the top ten seven times and appeared No. 1 on FHM "100 Sexiest Women in the World" the same year. She was named Esquire magazine's "Sexiest Woman Alive" in October 2008, about which she stated: "I don't know exactly what it means, but being 42 and having just had a baby, I think I'll take it." Men's Health ranked her at No. 35 on their "100 Hottest Women of All-Time" list. In 2009, she was voted #23 on Empire's 100 Sexiest Film Stars. The same year, rapper Hurricane Chris released a song titled "Halle Berry (She's Fine)" extolling Berry's beauty and sex appeal. At the age of 42 (in 2008), she was named the "Sexiest Black Woman" by Access Hollywood's "TV One Access" survey. Born to an African-American father and a white mother, Berry has stated that her biracial background was "painful and confusing" when she was a young woman, and she made the decision early on to identify as a black woman because she knew that was how she would be perceived.

Personal life
Berry dated Chicago dentist John Ronan from March 1989 to October 1991. In November 1993, Ronan sued Berry for $80,000 in what he claimed were unpaid loans to help launch her career. Berry contended that the money was a gift, and a judge dismissed the case because Ronan did not list Berry as a debtor when he filed for bankruptcy in 1992.

According to Berry, a beating from a former abusive boyfriend during the filming of The Last Boy Scout in 1991 punctured her eardrum and caused her to lose 80% of her hearing in her left ear. She has never named the abuser, but said that he was someone "well known in Hollywood". In 2004, her former boyfriend Christopher Williams accused Wesley Snipes of being responsible for the incident, saying, "I'm so tired of people thinking I'm the guy [who did it]. Wesley Snipes busted her eardrum, not me."

Berry first saw baseball player David Justice on TV playing in an MTV celebrity baseball game in February 1992. When a reporter from Justice's hometown of Cincinnati told her that Justice was a fan, Berry gave her phone number to the reporter to give to Justice. Berry married Justice shortly after midnight on January 1, 1993. Following their separation in February 1996, Berry stated publicly that she was so depressed that she considered taking her own life. Berry and Justice were officially divorced on June 20, 1997.

In May 2000, Berry pleaded no contest to charges of leaving the scene of a car accident and was sentenced to three years’ probation, fined $13,500 and ordered to perform 200 hours of community service.

Berry married her second husband, singer-songwriter Eric Benét, on January 24, 2001, following a two-year courtship. Benét underwent treatment for sex addiction in 2002, and by early October 2003 they had separated, with the divorce finalized on January 3, 2005.

In November 2005, Berry began dating French-Canadian model Gabriel Aubry, whom she met at a Versace photoshoot. Berry gave birth to their daughter in March 2008. On April 30, 2010, Berry and Aubry announced their relationship had ended some months earlier. In January 2011, Berry and Aubry became involved in a highly publicized custody battle, centered primarily on Berry's desire to move with their daughter from Los Angeles, where Berry and Aubry resided, to France, the home of French actor Olivier Martinez, whom Berry had started dating in 2010 after they met while filming Dark Tide in South Africa. Aubry objected to the move on the grounds that it would interfere with their joint custody arrangement. In November 2012, a judge denied Berry's request to move the couple's daughter to France in light of Aubry's objections. Less than two weeks later, on November 22, 2012, Aubry and Martinez were both treated at a hospital for injuries after engaging in a physical altercation at Berry's residence. Martinez performed a citizen's arrest on Aubry, and because it was considered a domestic violence incident, was granted a temporary emergency protective order preventing Aubry from coming within 100 yards of Berry, Martinez, and the child with whom he shares custody with Berry, until November 29, 2012. In turn, Aubry obtained a temporary restraining order against Martinez on November 26, 2012, asserting that the fight began when Martinez threatened to kill Aubry if he did not allow the couple to move to France. Leaked court documents included photos showing significant injuries to Aubry's face, which were widely displayed in the media. On November 29, 2012, Berry's lawyer announced that Berry and Aubry had reached an amicable custody agreement in court. In June 2014, a Superior Court ruling called for Berry to pay Aubry $16,000 a month in child support (around 200k/year) as well as a retroactive payment of $115,000 and a sum of $300,000 for Aubry's attorney fees.

Berry and Martinez confirmed their engagement in March 2012, and married in France on July 13, 2013. In October 2013, Berry gave birth to their son. In 2015, after two years of marriage, the couple announced they were divorcing. The divorce was reported to have been finalized in December 2016, however, as of November 2020, the case is ongoing.

Berry started dating Grammy winning American musician Van Hunt in 2020, which was revealed through her Instagram.

Activism
Along with Pierce Brosnan, Cindy Crawford, Jane Seymour, Dick Van Dyke, Téa Leoni, and Daryl Hannah, Berry successfully fought in 2006 against the Cabrillo Port Liquefied Natural Gas facility that was proposed off the coast of Malibu. Berry said, "I care about the air we breathe, I care about the marine life and the ecosystem of the ocean." In May 2007, Governor Arnold Schwarzenegger vetoed the facility. Hasty Pudding Theatricals gave her its 2006 Woman of The Year award. Berry took part in a nearly 2,000-house cell-phone bank campaign for Barack Obama in February 2008. In April 2013, she appeared in a video clip for Gucci's "Chime for Change" campaign that aims to raise funds and awareness of women's issues in terms of education, health, and justice. In August 2013, Berry testified alongside Jennifer Garner before the California State Assembly's Judiciary Committee in support of a bill that would protect celebrities' children from harassment by photographers. The bill passed in September.

Filmography

Film

Television

Awards and nominations

See also
 List of African American firsts
 List of female film and television directors
 List of LGBT-related films directed by women

References

General bibliography 
 Banting, Erinn. Halle Berry, Weigl Publishers, 2005. .
 Gogerly, Liz. Halle Berry, Raintree, 2005. .
 Naden, Corinne J. Halle Berry, Sagebrush Education Resources, 2001. .
 O'Brien, Daniel. Halle Berry, Reynolds & Hearn, 2003. .
 Sanello, Frank. Halle Berry: A Stormy Life, Virgin Books, 2003. .
 Schuman, Michael A. Halle Berry: Beauty Is Not Just Physical, Enslow, 2006. .

External links
 
 
 
 
 
 
 

1966 births
Living people
20th-century American actresses
21st-century American actresses
Actresses from Cleveland
African-American actresses
African-American beauty pageant winners
African-American female models
African-American models
African-American television producers
African-American film directors
American female models
American film actresses
American people of English descent
American television actresses
American voice actresses
American women film producers
American women television producers
Best Actress Academy Award winners
Best Miniseries or Television Movie Actress Golden Globe winners
Cuyahoga Community College alumni
Female models from Ohio
Film producers from Ohio
Miss USA 1986 delegates
Miss World 1986 delegates
Outstanding Performance by a Female Actor in a Leading Role Screen Actors Guild Award winners
Outstanding Performance by a Female Actor in a Miniseries or Television Movie Screen Actors Guild Award winners
Outstanding Performance by a Lead Actress in a Miniseries or Movie Primetime Emmy Award winners
People from Cuyahoga County, Ohio
People with type 1 diabetes
Silver Bear for Best Actress winners
Television producers from Ohio
20th-century African-American women
20th-century African-American people
21st-century African-American women
Baseball players' wives and girlfriends